Jan Landa (born 10 May 1986) is a Czech handball player for HK Lovosice and the Czech national team.

He participated at the 2018 European Men's Handball Championship.

References

1986 births
Living people
People from Litoměřice
Czech male handball players
Sportspeople from the Ústí nad Labem Region